St Catherine's Catholic School for Girls is a Roman Catholic girls' secondary school located in the Bexleyheath area of the London Borough of Bexley, England.

The school was established by La Sainte Union (Holy Union) sisters in 1953 as a convent school. It was converted to with academy status in February 2012, and was previously under the direct control of Bexley London Borough Council. The school continues to coordinate with the London borough of Bexely for admissions.

St Catherine's Catholic School for Girls offers GCSEs as programmes of study for pupils. Pupils also have the option to study equivalent vocational courses in certain subjects.

References

External links
St Catherine's Catholic School for Girls official website

Secondary schools in the London Borough of Bexley
Catholic secondary schools in the Archdiocese of Southwark
Girls' schools in London
Academies in the London Borough of Bexley
Educational institutions established in 1953
1953 establishments in England
Bexleyheath